Thrill of the Surf is a 1949 documentary about Australia's surf culture directed by Ken G Hall.

It was one of the first films sold to US television.

References

External links
Thrill of the Surf at IMDb
Thrill of the Surf at Australian Screen Online

Documentary films about surfing
Australian surfing films
Australian short documentary films
1949 films
1949 documentary films